Cirrhochrista perbrunnealis is a moth in the family Crambidae. It was described by Thomas Bainbrigge Fletcher in 1910. It is found on the Seychelles, where it has been recorded from Mahé, Ste. Anne and Curieuse.

References

Moths described in 1910
Spilomelinae
Moths of Africa